RDR may refer to:

Entertainment
 Red Dead Revolver, a western-themed video game published by Rockstar Games, released in 2004
 Red Dead Redemption, a western-themed video game published by Rockstar Games, released in 2010

Military
 Grand Forks Air Force Base (IATA airport code)
 Rhodesian Defence Regiment, Rhodesian Security Forces unit
 Royal Durban Rifles, now the Durban Light Infantry

Organizations
 Rassemblement Démocratique pour la République, a political party in the Democratic Republic of the Congo
 Rassemblement Démocratique pour le Rwanda, also known as "Rassemblement Démocratique pour la Retour", an insurgent group in Rwanda
 Rassemblement des Républicains, a political party in Côte d'Ivoire
 Rat für deutsche Rechtschreibung (RdR), German-language regulator
 Retail Distribution Review, a review carried out by the UK Financial Services Authority into the advising of retail investment products

Science and technology
 Restrictive design rules, a way for a semiconductor fabrication to ensure acceptable yield on its most advanced integrated circuits
 Ripple down rules, a knowledge acquisition methodology
 RNA-dependent RNA polymerase, an enzyme for RNA production

Transportation
 Royal Deeside Railway, a heritage railway in Scotland
 Radyr railway station (National Rail station code)

Other
 Registered Diplomate Reporter, a certification offered by the National Court Reporters Association